Ratheesh Vega is a composer, singer, and musician who works in Malayalam films. His debut as a film music composer was in the 2010 hit film Cocktail.

Career
Ratheesh completed his degree in music from Madras University. After his degree Ratheesh pursued a short course in sound engineering. But all the while he nursed hopes of becoming a Carnatic vocalist. He learnt music from Thrissur R. Vaidyanatha Bhagavathar.

For nearly two years Ratheesh spearheaded Music Talks on Malayalam channel Asianet. This show also provided the turnaround in Ratheesh's career. "It was during this time that I met Gopi Sunder, the noted music director and programmer. He told me that I could try my hand at composing music and also introduced me to many people in the music field. I believed in Gopi Sunder." -says Ratheesh Vega.

He has done jingles in all the South Indian languages with numerous clients and for many big brands. Some of them like Kalyan Silks, Josco, MCR and Joy Alukkas did a lot to soar his stock. Ratheesh won the Pepper Award in 2010 for his striking jingles.

In between all this, Ratheesh worked on a couple of albums. And these albums helped find his way into films. Of these 'Cafe Love' and 'Njanum Ente Ayyappa' had tunes with the typical Ratheesh Vegha stamp – a judicious blend of the East and West styles of music. "The Ayyappa devotional for Vox Music, US, was designed quite differently from the usual ones of the genre. It was priced at seven dollars and sold around 5,000 copies. But it was 'Café Love' (Sathyam Audios) that gave me my film break."- Remembers Ratheesh.

‘Café Love' had tracks sung by Unni Menon, Sujatha Mohan, Biju Narayanan, Vineeth Sreenivasan, Benny Dayal, Gopi Sunder and others. It had some melodies like Unni Menon's 'Ormayil…' and the trendy pop-styled 'Nestle coffee…' by Biju Narayanan and Thulasi Yatheendran.

He was introduced to Milan Jaleel, by one of his friends, who had heard the music of 'Cafe Love.' He immediately offered Ratheesh a chance in his film Cocktail. Music of Cocktail turned to be his best soundtrack, in which the songs like Neeyam Thanalinu by Vijay Yesudas and Thulasi Yatheendran topped the charts for weeks. And then the second chance for him came from Milan Jaleel himself to work in his next project, 'Kasargod Khaderbhai'.

Personal life
Ratheesh lives in Thrissur with his wife Dr. Anu Ratheesh Vega and children Nadhin Ratheesh Vega and Nirnav Ratheesh Vega

Discography

As music director

As a writer

As an actor

Non-film albums

Awards
 Best Music Director for Orissa – Kerala Film Critics Association Awards 2013
 Popular Song Award for "Aatumanal Payayil" Run Babby Run – CERA BIG Malayalam Music Award, 97.2 BIG FM 2013
 Best Music Director for Beautiful – The Kochi Times Film Award 2011
 Best Upcoming Music Director for Beautiful – Mirchi Music Awards South 2011
Best song award for “Janmandarangal” Orissa
Best Music Director for cocktail  Ramu Kariat Film Awards 2010
Best Music Director for “Mazhaneer Thullikal” Beautiful - Gireesh Puthenchery Award

References

External links
 Ratheesh Vegha – IMDb

Living people
Singers from Kerala
Indian male composers
Malayalam film score composers
Musicians from Palakkad
21st-century Indian composers
Film musicians from Kerala
Male film score composers
21st-century Indian male singers
21st-century Indian singers
Year of birth missing (living people)